This is a list of cities and towns in Thrace, a geographical region split between Bulgaria, Greece and Turkey. The largest cities of Thrace are: Istanbul (European side), Plovdiv, Burgas, Edirne, and Stara Zagora.

Eastern Thrace (Turkey)
Ahmediye (Greek: Φανοσάκρες Fanosakres / Φανοσάρκες Fanosarkes / Fanos Akrai)
Akalan (Greek: Μέτραι Metrae)
Akbaş (Sestos) (Greek: Σηστός Sistos)
Akören (Anaka, Avren, Akviran) (Bulgarian: Аврен Avren)
Alçıtepe (Kirte) (Greek: Κριθιά Krithia)
Alpullu (Greek: Αλεπλή Alepli, Bulgarian: Алпулу Alpulu)
Armutveren (Paspala)  (Bulgarian: Паспалово Paspalovo / Паспалево Paspalevo / Паспала Paspala)
Atışalanı (Greek: Avas)
Ambarlı (Amindos) (Greek: Άμπαρλι Ambarli / Amindos)  
Aydınlar (Greek: Alaton)
Babaeski (Greek: Βουρτοδιζό Bourtodizo / Καβύλη Kavyli / Βουργουδισσός Borgoudissos)
Barbaros (Greek: Πανίδος Panidos)
Başak (Sivas) (Greek: Sivas)
Beğendik (Ayostefano) (Greek: Άγιος Στέφανος Agios Stefanos, Bulgarian: Свети Стефан Sveti Stefan / Стефанo Stefano / Стефания Stefaniya)
Beğendik (Beyendik) (Greek: Ηρωικό Iroiko)
Binkılıç (Istranca) (Greek: Strantza, Bulgarian: Странджа Strandža)
Bolayır (Greek: Πλαγιάρι Plagiari, Bulgaristan: Булаир Bulair)   
Büyükçekmece (Çekmece-i Kebir) (Greek: Άθυρος Athyros / Άθυρα Athyra / Mega Zeûgma / Áthyras) 
Büyükkarıştıran (Greek: Δρουσίπαρα Drousipara / Δριζίπαρος Driziparos / Μεσσηνη Messini) 
Celaliye (Şatıroz, Çetros, Sahteros) (Greek: Ξάστερο Ksastero / Heksastérion / Heksastros / Heksásteron)
Çakıl (Greek: Πετροχώρι Petrohori / Τσακήλι Tsakili)
Çatalca (Metra) (Greek: Μέτρες Metres / Ἐργίσκη Ergískē / Métrai / Pharsalos / Pharsala, Bulgarian: Чаталджа Chataldzha) 
Çerkezköy (Türbedere) (Greek: Τσερκέζκιοϊ Tserkezkioi)
Çorlu (Greek: Τυρολόη Tyroloi / Συράλον Syralon; Bulgarian: Чорлу Chorlu)
Çukurpınar (Sazara) (Bulgarian: Сазара Sazara)
Demirköy (Bulgarian: Малък Самоков Malak Samokov; Greek: Μικρόν Σαμμακόβιον Mikron Sammakovion / Σαμάκοβο Samakovo / Σαμάκοβον Samakovon)
Durusu (Terkos) (Greek: Δέρκος Derkos, Delkos) 
Edirne (Greek: Αδριανούπολη Adrianoupoli; Bulgarian: Одрин Odrin) refounded by Hadrian
Eceabat (Maydos) (Greek: Μάδυτος Madytos)
Elbasan (Greek: Ελβασάν Elbasan / Αλμπασαν Albasan / Alvanási / Aatios)
Enez (Greek: Αίνος Ainos; Bulgarian: Енос Enos)
Eriklice (Greek: Ηρακλίτσα Iraklitsa)
Esenler (Greek: Litros)
Esenyurt (Eşkinoz) (Greek: Eskinos / Theodorukome)
Evreşe (Greek: Αφροδισία Afrodisia / Oρσα Orsa)
Fener (Fenerköy) (Greek: Phanárion / Φανάρι Fanari, Bulgarian: Фенеркьой Fenerkoi)
Firuzköy (Greek: Firos) 
 (Greek: Γάνος Ganos) 
Gelibolu (Greek: Καλλίπολι Κallipoli (= beautiful city); Bulgarian: Галиполи Galipoli)
Gelibolu Peninsula (Greek: Χερσόνησος της Καλλίπολης Hersonisos tis Kallipolis)
Gümüşyaka (Eski Ereğli) (Greek: Παλιά Ηράκλεια Palia Irakleia) 
Gürpınar (Anarşa) (Greek: Αρεσού Aresoú / Αρετώ Areto / Αρσού Arsou / Ανάρσα Anarsa / Άνω Αρσού Anô Arsoú / Anarkha)
Güzelce (Çöplüce) (Greek: Δημοκράνεια Dimokraneia / Δημοκράτεια Dimokrateia / Damokráneia, Panagía)
Hacıdanişment (Cöke) (Bulgarian: ЧокеChoke)
Haramidere (Güzelyurt) (Greek: Σταυροδρόμος Stavrodromos) 
Havza (Greek: Χάφσα Hafsa) 
Hayrabolu (Greek: Χαριούπολη Harioupoli)
Hoşdere (Bojdar, Boşdere) (Bulgarian: Bojdar) 
Hoşköy (Hora) (Greek: Χώρα Hora) 
Işıklar (Greek: Σχολάρι Skholari) 
Ispartakule (Greek: Σπράδων Spradon)
İğneada (Greek: Θυνιάς Thynias / Νιάδα Niada / Ινιάδα Iniada) 
İmrahor (Greek: Ιμβροχώρι Imvrohori)  
İpsala (Greek: Κύψελα Kypsela) 
İstanbul (European side) (Greek: Κωνσταντινούπολις Konstantinoupolis (= city of Constantine) or Βυζάντιον Vyzantion, the ancient Greek name, named after the founder of the city Vyzantas; Bulgarian: Цариград Tsarigrad or Константинопол Konstantinopol or Византион / Vizantion)
Arnavutköy (Greek: Μέγα Ρεύμα Mega Revma (= great stream))
Bakırköy (Greek: Μακροχώρι Makrohori / Έβδομον Ebdomon)
Beşiktaş (Greek: Διπλοκιόνιον Diplokionion)  
Beyoğlu (Pera) (Greek: Πέρα Pera)
Boyacıköy (Greek: Βαφειοχώρι Vafeiohori)
Florya (Greek: Phlorion)
İstinye (Greek: Σωσθένιον Sosthenion) 
Kumkapı (Greek: Κοντοσκάλι Kontoskali)
Kurtuluş (Tatavla) (Greek: Ταταύλα Tatavla)
Samatya (Greek: Ψαμάθεια Psamatheia)
Sarıyer (Greek: Σιμάς Simas)
Sultanahmet (Greek: Ιππόδρομος Ippodromos(= Hippodrome))
Şenlikköy (Greek: Kalitarya / Galatarya)
Taksim (Greek: Αγία Τριάς Agia Trias)
Tarabya (Greek: Θεραπειά Therapeia / Φαρμακεία Farmakeia)
Yedikule (Greek: Επταπύργιον Eptapyrgion (= seven towers))
Yeniköy (Greek: Νεοχώριον Neohorion (= new village))
Kadıköy, Malkara (Bulgarian: Кадъкьой Kadikoi) 
Kâmiloba (Yaloz) (Greek: Αιγιαλοί Eyali) 
Karaağaç (Greek: Καραγάτς Karagats) 
Karacaköy (Belgratköy) (Greek: Βελιγραδάκι Beligradaki, Belgradáki (= little Belgrade))
Kavakköy (Seydikavak, Lizimahiya, Lefki) (Greek: Λευκή Lefkī́, Bulgarian: Кавак Kavak)
Kavaklı (Fete) (Greek: Fete)
Kavaklı (Garda, Gardan, Garden) (Greek: Γάρδας, Γαρδάς Gardás)  
Kaynarca (Greek: Γέννα Genna)
Kemerburgaz (Greek: Πύργος Pyrgos)
Kermeyan (Greek: Ἄπρος Apros, Ἄπροι Ἄπροι, Apris, Apri)   
Keşan (Greek: Κεσσάνη Kessani; Bulgarian: Кешан Keshan)
Kınalı (Greek: Kινάλι Kinali)
Kıraç (Kalyos) (Greek: Kalios / Καλιώ Kalio) 
Kırklareli (Kırkkilise) (Bulgarian: Лозенград Lozengrad; Greek: Σαράντα Εκκλησιές Saranta Ekklysies(= forty churches))
Kıyıköy (Midye) (Greek: Σαλμυδησσός Salmydissos / Μήδεια Mideia / Αλμυδησσός Almydissos; Bulgarian: Мидия Midiya)
Kilitbahir (Greek: Κυνόσσημα Kynossima)
Kilyos (Greek: Κίλια Kilia)
Kofçaz (Bulgarian: Ковчас Kovchas)
Kumburgaz (Greek: Οικονομοίο, Οικονομειό, Ikonomio, Konomio, Oikonomeíon,  Oikonomeíou Pyrgos)
Kurfallı (Greek: Koúrphaloi, Kainophroúrion, Kenophlôrion)
Küçükçekmece (Greek: Ρήγιον Rigion (Rhegion), Βαθονεία Bathonea)
Lalapaşa (Greek: Λαλά Πασά Lala Pasa)
Lüleburgaz (Greek: Αρκαδιούπολις Arkadioupolis (= city of Arcadius) / Βεργούλη Bergouli; Bulgarian: Люлебургас Lyuleburgas)
Mahmutbey (Greek: Κάλφας Kalfas)
Malkara (Greek: Μάλγαρα Malgara, Bulgarian: Малгара Malgara)
Marmara Ereğlisi (Greek: Πέρινθος Perinthos / Ηράκλεια Θρακική Irakleia Thrakiki)
Marmara Mahallesi (Angurya), Yakuplu (Greek: Anguria)
Mecidiye (Greek: Λόβρυς Lovrys)
Mimarsinan (Kalikratiya) (Greek: Καλλικράτεια Kallikráteia)
Muratlı (Greek: Μουρατλί Mouratli)
Mürefte (Greek: Μυριόφυτο Myriofyto, Bulgarian: Мюрефте Myurefte)
Nakkaş (Greek: Ennakósia, Hennakósia)
Ovayenice (Nihor) (Greek: Νεοχώρι Neohori / Neochorion / Nichori)
Ortaköy (Sürgünköy) (Greek: Δελλιώνες Delliones)
Örencik (Tahirfakı, Tahırfağı, Tahir Fakih) (Greek: Tarfa)
Pehlivanköy (Pavliköy) (Greek: Παυλίκιοϊ Pavlikioi) 
Pınarhisar (Greek: Βρύση Vrysi)
Saray (Greek: Ανάκτορο Anaktoro)
Sarayakpınar (Sırpsındığı) (Greek: Σαράικπινάρ Saraikpinar, Bulgarian: Акбунар Akbunar)
Saros Gulf (Greek:  Κόλπος Ξηρού Kolpos Ksyrou)
Seddülbahir (Greek: Ελαιούς Elaious)
Sefaköy (Safraköy, Sofraköy)  (Greek: Sofranatis)
Selimpaşa (Biğados, Bivados, Epivati) (Greek: Επιβάτες Epivates / Epibátes / Daoneion)
Silivri (Greek: Σηλυμβρία Silymvria, Sêlymbria, Bulgarian: Силиврия Silivriya)
Sinekli (Greek: Καινοφρούριον Kainophrourion)
Şarköy (Greek: Περίσταση Peristasi / Τειρίστασις Teiristasis, Bulgarian: Шаркьой Sharkoi)
Şerbettar (Şaraplar) (Greek: Σαραπλάρ Saraplar)
Tekirdağ (Rodosçuk, Tekfurdağ) (Greek: Ραιδεστός Raidestos / Βυσάνθη Bysanthi; Bulgarian: Родосто Rodosto)
Tepecik (Playa) (Greek: Πλάγια Plágia)
Türkoba (Greek: Λαγοθήρες Lagothires)
Uçmakdere (Greek: Αϋδίμιο Aidimio)
Uzunköprü (Greek: Μακρά Γέφυρα Makra Gefyra (= long bridge); Bulgarian: Узункьопрю Uzunkyopryu)
Üsküp (Greek: Σκοπός Skopos)
Vize (Greek: Βιζύη Vizyi)
Yakuplu (Trakatya, Tarakatiya) (Greek: Trakadia / Trakada / Trakatia / Trakas)
Yalıköy (Podima) (Greek: Πόδημα Podima, Pódêma (= boot)/ Ασκός Askós)
Yarımburgaz (Greek (incorrectly): Melantias or Melantiada, Schiza)
Yazlıkköy (Greek: Lazaroxôri)
Yeşilbayır (Muha) (Greek: Muxa)
Yeşilköy (Ayastefanos) (Greek: Αγιος Στέφανος Agios Stefanos, Bulgarian: Сан Стефано San Stefano / Йешилкьой Yeshilkoi, Свети Стефан Sveti Stefan)
Yıldız Mountains (Istranca) (Bulgarian: Странджа Strandja; Greek: Στρά(ν)τζα Stra(n)tza)
Yoğuntaş (Greek: Σκόπελος Skopelos)
Yolçatı (Gelevri) (Greek: Kalabría, Kalaurê)

Northern Thrace (Bulgaria)
Burgas (Bulgarian: Бургас; Greek: Πύργος Pyrgos (= tower); Turkish: Burgaz)
Ahtopol (Bulgarian: Ахтопол; Greek: Αγαθούπολη /Agathopolis; Turkish: Ahtabolu) 
Aytos (Bulgarian: Айтос; Greek: Αετός Aetos (= eagle); Turkish: Aydos)
Emona (Bulgarian: Емона; Turkish: Emine)
Gyulyovtsa (Bulgarian: Гюльовца; Turkish: Güller)
Kameno (Bulgarian: Камено; Turkish: Kayalı)
Karnobat (Bulgarian: Карнобат; Turkish: Karinabat)
Kosharitsa (Bulgarian: Кошарица; Turkish: Kışla Dere)
Koznitsa (Bulgarian: Козница; Turkish: Karamanca)
Malko Tarnovo (Bulgarian: Малко Търново; Turkish: Tırnovacık)
Nesebar (Bulgarian: Несебър; Greek: Μεσημβρία Mesembria; Turkish: Misivri)
Obzor (Bulgarian: Обзор; Turkish: Gözeken)
Orizare (Bulgarian: Оризаре; Turkish: Baraklı / Bayraklı)
Panitsovo (Bulgarian: Паницово; Turkish: Alçak Dere)
Pomorie (Bulgarian: Поморие; Greek: Αγχίαλος Anchialos; Turkish: Ahyolu)
Primorsko (Bulgarian: Приморско; Turkish: Köprü Liman)
Priseltsi (Bulgarian: Приселци; Turkish: Yeniköy)
Rakovskovo (Bulgarian: Раковсково; Turkish: Kuru Dere)
Ruen (Bulgarian: Руен; Turkish: Ulanlı / Oğlanlı)
Rusokastro (Bulgarian: Русокастро; Turkish: Rus Kasrı / Rusi Kasrı)
Sinemorets (Bulgarian: Синеморец; Turkish: Kalanca)
Sozopol (Bulgarian: Созопол; Greek: Σωζόπολη Sozopoli; Turkish: Süzebolu)
Sredets (Bulgarian: Средец; Turkish: Kara Pınar / Sülmeşli)
Sungurlare (Bulgarian: Сунгурларе; Turkish: Sungurlar)
Sveti Vlas (Bulgarian: Свети Влас; Turkish: Küçük Manastır)
Tankovo (Bulgarian: Тънково; Turkish: İnce Köy)
Tsarevo (Bulgarian: Царево; Greek: Βασιλικό / Vassiliko (= royal); Turkish: Vasilikoz)
Haskovo (Bulgarian: Хасково; Turkish: Hasköy)
Dimitrovgrad (Bulgarian: Димитровград; Turkish: Kayacık)
Generalovo (Bulgarian: Генералово; Turkish: Paşaköy)
Harmanli (Bulgarian: Харманли; Turkish: Harmanlı)
Ivaylovgrad (Bulgarian: Ивайловград; Greek: Αρτάκη Artake; Turkish: Ortaköy)
Kapitan Andreevo (Bulgarian: Капитан Андреево; Turkish: Viran Tekke)
Lyubimets (Bulgarian: Любимец; Turkish: Habibçeova)
Madzharovo (Bulgarian: Маджарово; Turkish: Yatakçık)
Mineralni Bani (Bulgarian: Минерални бани; Turkish: Meriçler)
Simeonovgrad (Bulgarian: Симеоновград; Turkish: Seymen)
Stambolovo (Bulgarian: Стамболово; Turkish: Eller)
Svilengrad (Bulgarian: Свиленград; Turkish: Cisri Mustafapaşa)
Topolovgrad (Bulgarian: Тополовград; Turkish: Kavaklı, Greek: Καβακλή Kavakli)
Kardzhali (Bulgarian: Кърджали; Greek: Κάρτζαλι; Turkish: Kırcaali)
Ardino (Bulgarian: Ардино; Turkish: Eğridere)
Chernoochene (Bulgarian: Черноочене; Turkish: Karagözler / Yeni Pazar)
Dzhebel (Bulgarian: Джебел; Turkish: Cebel / Şeyh Cuma)
Kirkovo (Bulgarian: Кирково; Turkish: Kırkova / Kızılağaç)
Krumovgrad (Bulgarian: Крумовград; Turkish: Koşukavak) 
Momchilgrad (Bulgarian: Момчилград; Turkish: Mestanlı / Sultanyeri)
Pazardzhik (Bulgarian: Пазарджик; Turkish: Pazarcık / Tatarpazarcığı / Tatarpazarcık)
Batak (Bulgarian: Батак; Turkish: Batak)
Isperikhovo (Bulgarian: Исперихово; Turkish: Aydınköy)
Panagyurishte (Bulgarian: Панагюрище; Turkish: Otlukköy / Panagürişte)
Peshtera (Bulgarian: Пещера; Greek: Περιστέρα Peristera (= pigeon); Turkish: Peştere)
Pistiros (Bulgarian: Пистирос; Greek: Πίστειρος Pistiros)
Rakitovo (Bulgarian: Ракитово; Turkish: Rakit Ova)
Sarnitsa (Bulgarian: Сърница; Turkish: Sarnıç / Şabanlı)
Septemvri (Bulgarian: Септември; Turkish: Saranbey / Saruhanbey / Sarahanbey / Saruhan)
Strelcha (Bulgarian: Стрелча; Turkish: İstirelçe)
Velingrad (Bulgarian: Велинград; Turkish: Çepine & Ilıcalar & Kameniçe )
Plovdiv (Bulgarian: Пловдив; Turkish: Filibe, Greek: Φιλιππούπολη Philippoupoli)
Asenovgrad (Bulgarian: Асеновград; Greek: Στενήμαχος / Stenimachos; Turkish: İstanimaka)
Banya (Bulgarian: Баня; Turkish: Banya)
Hisarya (Bulgarian: Хисаря; Turkish: Hisar (=fort))
Kaloyanovo (Bulgarian: Калояново)
Karlovo (Bulgarian: Карлово; Turkish: Karlıova)
Krichim (Bulgarian: Кричим; Turkish: Kırçma / Kriçime)
Maritsa (Bulgarian: Марица; Turkish: Meriç)
Parvomay (Bulgarian: Първомай; Turkish: Hacı İlyas)
Perushtitsa (Bulgarian: Перущица; Turkish: Peruştiçe)
Rakovski (Bulgarian: Раковски; Turkish: Sarı Kılıçlı & Baltacılar & Ali Fakıh)
Sadovo (Bulgarian: Садово; Turkish: Çeşnegir)
Saedinenie (Bulgarian: Съединение; Turkish: Büyük Koruköy / Koruköy / Karaağaç Koruköy)
Stamboliyski (Bulgarian: Стамболийски; Turkish: Yeni Kırçma / Yeni Kriçime)
Sliven (Bulgarian: Сливен; Greek: Σλίβεν, rarely Σήλυμνος Selymnos; Turkish: İslimye)
Kermen (Bulgarian: Кермен; Turkish: Keremenli / Germiyanlı)
Kotel (Bulgarian: Котел; Turkish: Kazan)
Nova Zagora (Bulgarian: Нова Загора; Greek: Νέα Ζαγορά Nea Zagora; Turkish: Yeni Zağra / Zağra-i Cedid) 
Smolyan (Bulgarian: Смолян; Turkish: Ahiçelebi / Paşmaklı)
Borino (Bulgarian: Борино; Turkish: Karabulak)
Chavdar (Bulgarian: Чавдар; Turkish: Çavdar)
Chepelare (Bulgarian: Чепеларе; Turkish: Çepelli)
Devin (Bulgarian: Девин; Turkish: Dövlen / Ropçoz)
Dospat (Bulgarian: Доспат; Turkish: Dospat)
Madan (Bulgarian: Мадан; Turkish: Maden)
Nedelino (Bulgarian: Неделино; Turkish: Uzundere)
Rudozem (Bulgarian: Рудозем; Turkish: Palas)
Zlatograd (Bulgarian: Златоград; Turkish: Darıdere)
Stara Zagora (Bulgarian: Стара Загора; Greek: Παλαιά Ζαγορά Palaea Zagora; Turkish: Eski Zağra)
Bratya Daskalovi (Bulgarian: Братя Даскалови; Turkish: Burunsuz)
Chirpan (Bulgarian: Чирпан; Turkish: Çırpan)
Gurkovo (Bulgarian: Гурково; Turkish: Hanköy)
Kazanlak (Bulgarian: Казанлък; Turkish: Kızanlık / Kazanlık)
Nikolaevo (Bulgarian: Николаево; Turkish: Eşekçi)
Radnevo (Bulgarian: Раднево; Turkish: Radne Mahalle)
Seuthopolis (ancient city) (Bulgarian: Сефтополис; Greek: Σευθούπολις Sefthoupolis)
Shipka (Bulgarian: Шипка; Turkish: Şipka)
Tsenovo (Bulgarian: Ценово; Turkish: Şenova)
Tulovo (Bulgarian: Тиле / Тилис / Тулово; Greek: Τύλις Tylis; Turkish: Tile)
Yambol (Bulgarian: Яамбол; Greek: Υάμπολις Yampolis; Turkish: Yanbolu)
Bolyarovo (Bulgarian: Болярово; Turkish: Paşaköy)
Elhovo (Bulgarian: Елхово; Turkish: Kızılağaç / Çamlık)
Kabile (Bulgarian: Кабиле; Turkish: Tavşantepe)
Lesovo (Bulgarian: Лесово; Turkish: Urumbeyli)
Straldzha (Bulgarian: Стралджа; Turkish: Istralca)
Tundzha (Bulgarian: Тунджа; Turkish: Tunca)
Boyadzhik (Bulgarian: Бояджик; Turkish: Boyacık)

Western Thrace (Greece)
Abdera (Turkish: Bulustra)
Aigeiros (Turkish: Kavaklı)
Alexandroupoli (Turkish: Dedeağaç; Bulgarian: Дедеагач Dedeagach)
Amaxades (Turkish: Arabacıköy; Bulgarian: Арбаджикьой)
Amorio (Turkish: Karabeyli)
Ano Livera (Turkish: Yukarı Ada)
Antheia (Turkish: Şahinler)
Arriana (Turkish: Kozlukebir)
Arzos (Turkish: Kulaklı / Kulaklı Çiftliği)
Avato (Turkish: Beyköy / Beyköyü)
Chrysoupoli (Turkish: Sarışaban)
Dadia (Turkish: Çalıköy / Çamköy / Çamlıköy / Çam-ı Kebîr / Büyükçam)
Dafno (Turkish: Mahmutlu)
Didymoteicho (Turkish: Dimetoka; Bulgarian: Димотика Dimotika)
Dikaia (Turkish: Kadıköy)
Echinos (Turkish: Şahin)
Elaia (Turkish: Deleleşköy)
Erasmio (Turkish: Taraşmanlı)
Evlalo (Turkish: İnhanlı)
Feres (Turkish: Farecik / Ferecik)
Fillyra (Turkish: Sirkeli)
Fylakio (Turkish: Seymenli / İnceğiz)
Galani (Turkish: Çakırlı)
Genisea (Turkish: Yenice-i Karasu)
Iasmos (Turkish: Yassıköy)
Imera (Turkish: Saltuklu)
Ioniko (Turkish: Hüseyinköy)
Kalo Nera (Turkish: Meşeli)
Kastanidis (Turkish: Horozlu)
Kastanies (Turkish: Çörekköy / Kestanelik)
Kato Karyofyto (Turkish: Aşağı Kozluca)
Kato Livera (Turkish: Aşağı Ada)
Kechros (Turkish: Mehrikoz)
Kipoi (Turkish: Bahçeköy / Alibeyçiftliği)
Komara (Turkish: Komarlı / Kumarlı)
Komnina (Turkish: Kurlar)
Komotini (Turkish: Gümülcine, Bulgarian: Гюмюрджина Gyumyurdzhina)
Kotyli (Turkish: Kozluca, Bulgarian: Козлуджа Kozludzha)
Kyprinos (Turkish: Simavna / Sarı Hızır, Bulgarian: Саръхадър Sarahadar)
Kyriaki (Turkish: Kayacık)
Lagyna (Turkish: Çömlekçiköy)
Lavara (Turkish: Saltıköy / Saltık, Bulgarian: Салтъкьой Saltakyoy or Салтиково Saltikovo)
Livaditis (Turkish: Hamidiye)
Loutros (Turkish: Ulucabeyköy)
Lykodromio (Turkish: Kurtalan)
Marassia (Turkish: Maraş; Bulgarian: Мараш Marash)
Maroneia (Turkish: Maronya)
Mega Dereio (Turkish: Büyük Dervent / Büyük Derebent)
Metaxades (Turkish: Tokmakköy)
Mikro Dereio (Turkish: Küçük Dervent / Küçük Derebent)
Milia (Turkish: Bektaşlı)
Myki (Turkish: Mustafçova)
Nea Vyssa (Turkish: Ahırköy)
Neo Sidirochori (Turkish: Cambaz)
Orestiada (Turkish: Kumçiftliği, Bulgarian: Орестиада Orestiada)
Organi (Turkish: Hemetli)
Ormenio (Turkish: Çirmen; Bulgarian: Черномен Chernomen)
Paschalia (Turkish: Bayramlı)
Pentalofos (Turkish: Beştepe)
Petrota (Turkish: Taşlık)
Plati (Turkish: Sadırlı / Siderli)
Protokklisi (Turkish: Başkilise)
Ptelea (Turkish: Karaağaç)
Pythio (Turkish: Kuleliburgaz)
Rizia (Turkish: Dulcaaras / Tufanca-i Ardı)
Soufli (Turkish: Sofulu)
Samothrace (Turkish: Semadirek / Semendirek; Bulgarian: Самотраки Samotraki)
Sapes (Turkish: Şapçı; Bulgarian: Шапчи Şapçi)
Sideropetra (Turkish: Demirtaş)
Sostis (Turkish: Susurköy)
Soufli (Turkish: Sofulu, Bulgarian: Софлу Soflu)
Spilaio (Turkish: İspitli)
Stavrochorion (Turkish: Hocalar)
Stavroupoli (Turkish: Yeniköy, Bulgarian: Кръстополе Krastopole or Еникьой Enikyoy)
Therapeio (Turkish: Sarıyer)
Thymaria (Turkish: Köpekli)
Toxotai (Turkish: Okçular)
Tychero (Turkish: Bıdıklı)
Xanthi (Turkish: İskeçe; Bulgarian: Царево Tsarevo / Скеча Skecha)
Zoni (Turkish: Çavuşköy; Bulgarian: Чаушкьой Chaushkyoy'')

References

Thrace
Thrace
Thrace